Justin Phongsavanh (born May 19, 1997) is an American Paralympic athlete who specializes in javelin throw. He represented the United States at the 2020 Summer Paralympics.

Career
Phongsavanh made his international debut for the United States at the 2019 Parapan American Games where he won a gold medal in the javelin throw F54 event.

In June 2021, during the U.S. Paralympic Team Trials for Track and Field, Phongsavanh set the javelin throw world record with a distance of 33.29 meters. He represented the United States at the 2020 Summer Paralympics in the javelin throw F54 event and won a bronze medal.

Personal life
Phongsavah is of mixed Laotian and Caucasian ancestry. His biological parents were incarcerated when he was two years old and after spending time in the Iowa foster care system he was adopted by Tamera Shinn and raised in Ankeny, IA. On October 24, 2015, Phongsavanh was shot in a McDonald's parking lot. The bullet fragmented into five pieces, with one piece being lodged into his spine resulting in paraplegia.

References

1997 births
Living people
American male javelin throwers
People with paraplegia
Sportspeople from Des Moines, Iowa
Track and field athletes from Iowa
Medalists at the 2019 Parapan American Games
Paralympic track and field athletes of the United States
Athletes (track and field) at the 2020 Summer Paralympics
Medalists at the 2020 Summer Paralympics
Paralympic bronze medalists for the United States
Paralympic medalists in athletics (track and field)